Koren Lynard Robinson (born March 19, 1980) is a former American football wide receiver who played in the National Football League (NFL) for eight seasons.  He played college football for North Carolina State University.  He was drafted by the Seattle Seahawks ninth overall in the 2001 NFL Draft, and also played for the NFL's Minnesota Vikings and Green Bay Packers between stints with the Seahawks.  He was selected to the Pro Bowl with the Vikings in 2005.

Professional career

First stint with Seahawks
The Seattle Seahawks drafted Robinson with the 9th overall pick in the 2001 NFL Draft, which was acquired along with a first round pick that was used to select Shaun Alexander in a trade that sent Joey Galloway to the Dallas Cowboys.

Minnesota Vikings
Robinson was signed by the Minnesota Vikings. He was given a limited role in his time with the Vikings and was named the team's kick returner. Despite it being the first time in his career he had returned kicks, Robinson made the Pro Bowl in 2005.

Green Bay Packers
In September 2006, Robinson was signed by the Green Bay Packers, much by the urging of then-quarterback Brett Favre and GM Ted Thompson (former Seahawks executive who had drafted Robinson in 2001 in Seattle). Robinson was suspended without pay on October 16, 2006 for a minimum of one year for violating the NFL's substance abuse policy. Robinson worked out with Favre's trainer to stay in football shape. Robinson was reinstated by Commissioner Goodell in October 2007, and he completed the 2007 season with 21 catches for 241 yards and one touchdown.  His touchdown came against the Detroit Lions on December 30, 2007.

However, the Packers picked two younger receivers in the 2008 NFL Draft, creating a logjam at the position.  Robinson was deemed expendable, and the Packers released him on May 9, 2008. Packers General Manager Ted Thompson said, "I think a lot of Koren. I'm very proud to be able to see him turn things around. He's a true professional. He helped us in the locker room. He helped the young guys learn to be pros."

Second stint with Seahawks
On September 16, 2008, the Seahawks signed Robinson, due to the large number of injuries at the receiver position. In his second stint with the Seahawks, Robinson broke the franchise record with the longest catch in team history. Backup quarterback Seneca Wallace threw a pass to Robinson that went for 90 yards and a touchdown on the Seahawks' first play from scrimmage against the Philadelphia Eagles at Qwest Field in Seattle on November 2, 2008 which was also the longest pass in team history. On January 26, 2009 it was reported by Pro Football Weekly that Robinson was not expected to be back with the Seahawks the next season due to a chronic knee injury.

Florida Tuskers
Robinson was signed by the Florida Tuskers of the United Football League on September 3, 2009.

New York Sentinels
Robinson was traded to the Sentinels for future considerations.

NFL career statistics

References

1980 births
Living people
American football wide receivers
American football return specialists
NC State Wolfpack football players
Seattle Seahawks players
Minnesota Vikings players
Green Bay Packers players
National Conference Pro Bowl players
Florida Tuskers players
New York Sentinels players
People from Belmont, North Carolina
People who entered an Alford plea
Ed Block Courage Award recipients